Warren Kiefer (1929–1995) was an American film director and screenwriter from New Jersey. He used the alias Lorenzo Sabatini, while working in Italy. He named himself after the 16th-century painter Lorenzo Sabbatini, who he admired.

Early life 

In 1929, Kiefer was born in New Jersey. He received his college education at both the University of New Mexico and the University of Maryland. He got married and in 1958 started a career as a novelist. His first novel was Pax (1958), a hardboiled novel. It was co-written with Harry J. Middleton, and published under the pseudonym "Middleton Kiefer".

Film career 

In the late 1950s, Kiefer had a son named Alden Kiefer. For unclear reasons, Kiefer soon left his family behind and moved to Italy. Kiefer had left his previous work and his family in the United States, in order to find work in the Italian film industry. He worked in Cinecittà, where he befriended expatriate film producer Paul Maslansky. The two decided to co-operate in creating their own feature film. Kiefer had already shot a documentary for Esso in Libya.

Kiefer was the main director of the gothic film Castle of the Living Dead (1964). The film was an official "Italo-French co-production". To receive state subsidies, the film required an Italian director. So Kiefer could not be directly credited for the film. Italian prints and posters instead credited "Herbert Wise" as the director of the film. "Wise" was an alias used by Luciano Ricci, the film's first assistant director. Ricci had registered the pseudonym for his work in the film Alone Against Rome (1962).

Kiefer was the director of three more Italian films: Next of Kin (1968), Juliet De Sade (1969), and Defeat of the Mafia (1970). Unlike Castle, these are "largely forgotten" films. They are rarely seen in the 21st century. His screenwriting credits include the Western film Beyond the Law.

At a later point in his life (in 1989), Kiefer claimed to have actually directed at least six films after Castle. He also claimed to have scripted twenty more films. All his work reportedly was produced in Italy, and Italian directors received the official credit for the films. Kiefer reportedly only received the payment for his uncredited work. It is unclear whether he exaggerated when reporting his life story, or whether his account of his own career was accurate.

Novelist 

Kiefer was also a novelist, and wrote eight thriller novels. His best known novel was The Lingala Code (1972), which won the 1973 Edgar Award. The novel was set in the Democratic Republic of the Congo, at the period following the assassination of Patrice Lumumba (1961). By his own account, Kiefer had visited the Congo, and his experiences there served as a background for the novel.

His third novel was The Pontius Pilate Papers (1976), a fast-paced adventure novel. It had theological undertones. His fourth novel was named The Kidnappers (1977), and its setting was Argentina.

Death 

In the early 1970s, Kiefer moved to Argentina. He lived the rest of his life in Buenos Aires until dying of a heart attack in 1995.

References

Footnotes

Sources

External links
 
 Warren Kiefer: The Man Who Wasn’t There. Article by Roberto Curti.

1929 births
1995 deaths
20th-century American novelists
20th-century American screenwriters
American expatriates in Argentina
American expatriates in Italy
American male novelists
American thriller writers
Edgar Award winners
Film directors from New Jersey
Novelists from New Jersey
Screenwriters from New Jersey
University of New Mexico alumni
University of Maryland, College Park alumni
20th-century American male writers